Live in Japan is a live album by the Polish death metal band Vader. It was released in 1998 by Metal Mind Productions in Poland, System Shock/Impact Records in Europe, and Pavement Music in United States. The Japanese edition with two bonus tracks was released by Avalon/Marquee.

Live in Japan was recorded at Club Quattro in Tokyo on 31 August 1998 by Sound Creators Inc.. Mastering took place at Selani Studio in Olsztyn, Poland in September 1998, and was made by Andrzej "Andy" Bomba. The album was produced by Piotr "Peter" Wiwczarek, who shared mixing duties with Krzysztof "Docent" Raczkowski, and Tomasz "Tom" Bonarowski.

Track listing

Personnel 
Production and performance credits are adapted from the album liner notes.

 Vader
 Piotr "Peter" Wiwczarek – lead vocals, rhythm guitar, lead guitar, production, mixing
 Maurycy "Mauser" Stefanowicz – rhythm guitar, lead guitar
 Leszek "Shambo" Rakowski – bass guitar
 Krzysztof "Docent" Raczkowski – drums, mixing
 Note
Recorded at Club Quattro, Tokyo, 31 August 1998.
Mixed at Red Studio, Gdynia, 22.09-30.09.1998.
Digital edited at Red Studio, Gdynia, 1 October 1998.

 Production
 Jacek Wiśniewski – cover art and design
 Tomasz "Tom" Bonarowski – digital editing, mixing
 Andrzej "Andy" Bomba – mastering
 Mariusz Kmiolek – mastering
 Osamu "Tio" Suzuki – live photos
 Takahisa Okuno – Japanese liner notes
 Krzysztof Mierzwiński – engineering
 Shinya Tanaka – mobile recording engineer
 Mika Furukawa – lighting staff
 Osamu "Tio" Suzuki – photography
 Atsuhiro Morishige – mobile recording assistant
 Naoto Hoshino – mobile recording assistant
 Tomomi Shimura – mobile recording assistant
 Yutaka Makido – mobile recording assistant
 Keisuke Hatsushika – technician
 Misae Shiroyama – technician

Release history

References 

Vader (band) albums
1998 live albums
Metal Mind Productions albums